María Sol Branz (born 6 February 1990), known as Sol Branz, is an Argentine sailor. She and Victoria Travascio won a gold medal in the women's 49erFX event at the 2015 Pan American Games, and bronze in the 2019 edition.

The two also competed in two Olympic Games, finishing 13th in the 49erFX event at the 2016 Summer Olympics, and fifth at the 2020 Summer Olympics.

References

External links
 
 
 
 
 

1990 births
Living people
Argentine female sailors (sport)
Olympic sailors of Argentina
Sailors at the 2016 Summer Olympics – 49er FX
Sailors at the 2015 Pan American Games
Pan American Games gold medalists for Argentina
Pan American Games medalists in sailing
Sailors at the 2019 Pan American Games
Medalists at the 2019 Pan American Games
Medalists at the 2015 Pan American Games
Sailors at the 2020 Summer Olympics – 49er FX
Sportspeople from Buenos Aires Province